Antoine-François Riccoboni (1707 – 15 May 1772) was an Italian actor of the Comédie-Italienne in Paris, whose stage name was Lélio fils.

Life
He was born Antonio Francesco Valentino Riccoboni in Mantua. His father was the celebrated actor Luigi Riccoboni, who became the director of the Comédie-Italienne in Paris in 1716, and his mother was the actress Elena Balletti (1686–1771). In 1734 he married Marie-Jeanne de La Boras.

Works 
In addition to several pieces of verse, a Satire sur le goût, le Conte sans R, and some other poems, Antoine-François Riccoboni wrote a great number of comedies of which the best, Les Caquets, in three acts in prose, translated or imitated from Carlo Goldoni, was successfully revived at the Théâtre Louvois in 1802.

In 1726 he performed in Marivaux's La Surprise de l'amour. He wrote more than 50 comedies in French including:

 1726: Les Comédiens esclaves
 1732: Les Amusements à la mode
 1735: Le Conte de Fée
 1760: Le Prétendu
 1760: Le Prétendu
 1761: Les Caquets
 1764: Les Amants de village

He also authored a treatise L'art du théâtre, published in 1750.
 1750: Art dit Théâtre, Paris, in-8°.

Notes

Bibliography
 Forman, Edward (2010). Historical Dictionary of French Theater. Lanham: The Scarecrow Press. .
 Hartnoll, Phyllis, editor (1983). The Oxford Companion to the Theatre (fourth edition). Oxford: Oxford University Press. .
 Senelick, Laurence (1995). "Riccoboni, family", p. 918 in The Cambridge Guide to the Theatre, edited by Martin Banham. Cambridge: Cambridge University Press. .

External links
 L'Art du théâtre, 1750 at Gallica
 L'Art du théâtre, 1750 at Google Books

18th-century Italian male actors
18th-century French male actors
French male stage actors
Commedia dell'arte
18th-century Italian writers
18th-century Italian male writers
18th-century French male writers
Italian writers in French
Italian dramatists and playwrights
18th-century French writers
18th-century French dramatists and playwrights
Actors from Mantua
1707 births
1772 deaths
Writers from Mantua